Tilburg Reeshof is a railway station located in the Reeshof in Tilburg, Netherlands. It is situated on the Breda–Eindhoven railway. The station was opened on 14 December 2003. The train services are operated by Nederlandse Spoorwegen.

Train service
The following services currently call at Tilburg Reeshof:
2x per hour local services (sprinter) Arnhem Centraal - Nijmegen - 's-Hertogenbosch - Tilburg - Breda - Dordrecht

Bus service

The station is served by the following city bus line, operated by Arriva:

External links
NS website 
Dutch Public Transport journey planner 

Reeshof
Railway stations opened in 2003